Valchiusa is a comune (municipality) in the Metropolitan City of Turin in the Italian region Piedmont, located about  north of Turin. It was formed on 1 January 2019 with the merger of the comunes of Meugliano, Trausella and Vico Canavese.

References

External links